The Indian Certificate of Secondary Education (ICSE) is an examination conducted by the Council for the Indian School Certificate Examinations, a private board designed to provide an examination in a course of general education, in accordance with the recommendations of the New Education Policy 1986 (India), through the medium of English.

The examination allows secure suitable representations of responsible schools (which are affiliated to it) in their states or territories. Private candidates are not permitted to appear for this examination
 

The ICSE is an English-medium examination. As such, the curriculum of all subjects (apart from Indian and foreign languages) is taught in English.

The National Admissions and Accreditation agency of the UK, UCAS (Universities and College Admission Services) recognizes ISCE at par with the Higher School qualification of University of Scotland.
ICSE (Indian Certificate of Secondary Education) is known for its comprehensive syllabus and primarily focus on English language and variety of subjects that it offers involving language, arts, commerce and science. ICSE is being taught in English Language only as a result of which, ICSE students gain great command over the English language and Literature from kindergarten which helps the students to acquire the art of writing compactly in English, which makes it easy for the ICSE passed out student to score well in competitive as well as language exams like IELTS, TOEFL etc.
ICSE has always been regarded as one of the best educational boards in the world in terms of their rigorous syllabus, tough marking scheme for examinations, progressive evaluation and promotion criteria. In India, most of the top schools are affiliated to ICSE board like Sherwood College-Nanital, Doon School-Dehradun, Mayo Girl’s College-Ajmer, La Martiniere College-Lucknow and many more.

Subjects
Students taking the ICSE must write examinations in any six, seven or eight subjects. Of these, five subjects will be included in their final grade — out of these five, one will compulsorily be English, even if it is the subject in which the student has scored the lowest marks. Certain subjects include two or three papers, that is, separately-held examinations for different spheres of a subject. For these subjects, the average marks obtained in the papers will be the final grade.

The subjects are divided into three groups. All Group I subjects, any two or three Group II subjects, and one Group III subject must be chosen by a student.

Group III (practical-/vocational-based subjects) 

 Computer Applications

 Economic Applications

 Commercial Applications

 Art (any two papers to be offered)
 Paper 1: Drawing or Painting from Still Life
 Paper 2: Drawing or Painting from Nature
 Paper 3: Original Imaginative Composition in Colour
 Paper 4: Applied Art
 Performing Arts
 Home Science
 Cookery
 Fashion Designing
 Physical Education
 Yoga
 Technical Drawing Applications
 Environmental Applications
 A Modern Foreign Language
 Mass Media & Communication
 Hospitality Management
 Beauty & Wellness (Skin & Beauty)

 Beauty & Wellness (Hair Styling)

Group I and Group II subjects consist of an 80-mark written examination along with 20 marks of project work or practical work (in the case of Science). Group III subjects, on the other hand, consist of a 100-mark written examination along with 100 marks of project work.

Grading 
ICSE grades are awarded in two ways. One is the percentage in each subject — the pass percentage in all subjects is 40% — and the other is a numerical scale with descriptions as follows.

Legal validity challenged
In the year 2015, the Ministry of Human Resource Development (now called Ministry of Education) had asked the Council for the Indian School Certificate Examinations (CISCE), which conducts the ICSE and the ISC examinations, to furnish evidence to justify its existence.

Criticism
In 2013, a 20-year-old Indian student studying in the US, Debarghya Das, claimed in his personal blog to have downloaded the ICSE scores for over 100,000 students by scraping. His analysis of the data showed interesting patterns in the marking system, suggesting that the marks were rounded off with no student getting under 33 marks out of a possible 100. The reason for this was reportedly attributed to moderation; a practice also followed by Central Board of Secondary Education (CBSE), it involved tweaking candidates' marks to account for paper variances.

References

External links
  of CISCE (homepage)

School qualifications of India
Secondary school qualifications